Billingsport is an unincorporated community within Paulsboro, in Gloucester County, New Jersey, United States. The community is located on the Delaware River. The area dates back to 1677, when it was originally known as Byllings Port, named for Edward Byllings, a Quaker of West Jersey.

See also
Fort Billingsport

References

1677 establishments in New Jersey
Paulsboro, New Jersey
Populated places established in 1677
Unincorporated communities in Gloucester County, New Jersey
Unincorporated communities in New Jersey